Danger Down Under is a 1988 TV movie by director Russ Mayberry which starred Lee Majors as Reed Harris, a successful American horse-breeder who has come to Australia on business and for one last chance to reconcile with his estranged wife Sharon and their sons. It was a pilot film for the NBC network for an unmade TV series The Hawkesbury.

References

External links

1987 television films
1987 films
Australian drama television films
1987 drama films
Films directed by Russ Mayberry
1980s English-language films